A night school is an adult learning school that holds classes in the evening or at night to accommodate people who work during the day. A community college or university may hold night school classes that admit undergraduates.

Italy 
The Scuola serale (evening school) is a structured institution for the education and training of professional adults in Italy.

The first evening schools opened in the first half of the nineteenth century under the pressure of the first civil strike organised by labor movements, with the main aim of reducing illiteracy. Major philanthropic actions contributed to the continued spread of Scuola Serale.

Beginning with elementary education, the first evening schools employed the educational process of "mutual education" (or mutual teaching) originated by British educators Andrew Bell and Joseph Lancaster, despite the scarcity of teachers. Initially, classes operated during the afternoon and evening. They were mainly frequented by peasants, workers and child laborers.

At the end of the century, provoked by a growing need to provide a complete technical and vocational training, evening classes spread in large industrial cities. Port technical schools helped initiate "Festive Sundays", a complement to the workshops that were only open on Sundays. Subsequently, these Sunday courses moved to the evening.

USA 
In the late 19th and early 20th centuries, some elementary and high schools in the US provided evening classes for children from poor families who were engaged in farm work. By 1910, the main focus had changed to teaching English to non-English-speaking immigrant children.

References

External links 

 Night School Ireland

Adult education
Night